The International Association of Fire Fighters (IAFF) is a labor union representing paid full-time firefighters and emergency medical services personnel in the United States and Canada. The IAFF was formed in 1918 and is affiliated with the AFL–CIO in the United States and the Canadian Labour Congress in Canada. The IAFF has more than 331,000 members in its more than 3,500 affiliate organizations. Its political action committee, FIREPAC, is one of the most active PACs in the country.

IAFF mission and history
The IAFF was formed in 1918. The IAFF has fought for better wages, benefits, working conditions and improved safety for union members. The IAFF has also pushed for more full-time union firefighters.

IAFF Center of Excellence for Behavioral Health Treatment and Recovery
The IAFF has announced plans to open the Center of Excellence for Behavioral Health Treatment and Recovery in 2017 located in Upper Marlboro, Maryland (outside Washington, DC). The IAFF Center of Excellence is intended for union members only and will offer treatment for recovery from post-traumatic stress and co-occurring addictions in hopes to help members return to the job. The center also will serve to train and educate peer support members in the treatment of post-traumatic stress and substance abuse in the fire fighter population. The ultimate goal is to develop protocols for fire departments to use to help fire fighters.

IAFF Legislative Conference
Each year the IAFF hosts a national legislative conference in Washington, DC that is open to any IAFF member who wishes to register. The IAFF legislative conference is the largest legislative conference of any union in the country.  Over the years, attendees have heard from President Bill Clinton, Vice President Joe Biden, members of the Cabinet of both Republican and Democratic administrations, numerous members of Congress, including the Leadership of the Senate and House of Representatives, and key congressional staff.

Membership restrictions
IAFF as a union represents full-time paid firefighters and emergency medical technicians, and membership is not open to volunteer firefighters. Its bylaws do not allow members to work or volunteer with any other emergency service organization beyond their full-time employer, and can have their membership revoked if they do, though in practice this rarely, if ever happens.

IAFF Fire Fighters Interested in Registration and Education Political Action Committee
FIREPAC (Fire Fighters Interested in Registration and Education Political Action Committee) is the federally registered political action committee of the IAFF.  FIREPAC was established in 1978 and has grown into the top one percent of all federally registered PACs.  During the 2009 – 2010 election cycle FIREPAC raised $5.3 million and was the tenth largest PAC in terms of donations to federal candidates.  Within organized labor, FIREPAC has been the most bi-partisan PAC during the last decade, contributing a larger percent of its donations to Republican candidates than any other union.  The IAFF follows a simple philosophy when it supporting candidates – they support those who support fire fighters, regardless of party affiliation or political leanings.

IAFF Charitable Foundation
The IAFF Charitable Foundation was formed in 2011 to assist IAFF union members and their families if affected by natural disaster (including hurricanes, earthquakes, floods) promotes fire and burn prevention, advocates for fire fighter health and safety, and provides public education on how to prevent and recover from burn trauma.

IAFF Fallen Fire Fighter Memorial
The IAFF Fallen Fire Fighter Memorial is a permanent remembrance of IAFF members and emergency medical services personnel who have lost their lives in the line of duty. An annual Fallen Firefighters memorial ceremony is held each year in September in Colorado Springs, Colorado (with the exception of 2020 and 2021 due to the Coronavirus (Covid-19) pandemic). More than 8,800 names of fallen IAFF members are etched on the wall.

Muscular Dystrophy Association support
The IAFF is the largest national sponsor of the Muscular Dystrophy Association (MDA). Members raise funds primarily through the "Fill the Boot" campaign, which helps fund MDA summer camps for children, professional and public health education and other programs. Total donations since 1954 are over $558 million.

Since 1966 the International Association of Fire Fighters has appeared on and co-sponsored The Jerry Lewis MDA Labor Day Telethon.

References

External links

Firefighters flex their political power, Teddy Davis, ABCnews.com, March 12, 2007
https://www.mda.org/press-releases/international-association-of-fire-fighters-launches-thousands-of-fill-the-boot-fundraisers-for-mda
International Association of Fire Fighters Collection at Florida International University

1918 establishments in the United States
AFL–CIO
Canadian Labour Congress
Firefighters associations
Fire protection organizations
Firefighting in the United States
Trade unions established in 1918
Firefighting in Canada